We Stand United  is the third studio album by pop group beFour via Universal Records. It was released on April 18, 2008 in German speaking Europe. The lead single from the album, "Live Your Dream" was officially released in March 2008 and became #1 in over five countries. The next single, "Happy Holiday", was a smash-hit.

Production

Just like the previous two studio albums of the band, All 4 One and Hand in Hand - The Winter Album, Christian Geller and Adam Bernau have also produced this one. The song Happy Holiday was written by Geller, Alexei Potechin and Sergei Zhukov. The title Zabadak was written by Ken Howard and Alan Blaikley. Another song not written by Geller and Bernau is Give It Up, written by Harry Wayne Casey and Deborah Carter. In addition, the album is a radio play trailer entitled Undercover, which is the longest title of the CD with a duration of 4:23 min.

Release

The studio album was released on April 18, 2008 in Germany, Austria and Switzerland. In Germany, the longplayer made it to tenth place in the German album charts and stayed there for a total of 20 weeks. In Austria, We Stand United was immediately placed fourth and also stayed in the charts for 20 weeks. The album finished eleventh in the Swiss hit parade, here it stayed 21 weeks in the charts.

As the only single release appeared on March 14, 2008, the song Live Your Dream (Live your dream) in German-speaking countries. The title reached number 16 in the German single charts and stayed there for nine weeks. In Austria, the song made it to 17th position and was on the charts for eleven weeks. In Switzerland, the piece made it to number 29. After nine weeks, the song fell from the chart standings. The director of the shooting of the music video led Mark Feuerstake.

Track listing

Charts

2007 albums
BeFour albums